Mount Qaf, or Qaf-Kuh, also spelled Cafcuh and Kafkuh, or Jabal Qaf, also spelled Djebel Qaf, or Koh-i-Qaf, also spelled Koh-Qaf and Kuh-i-Qaf or Kuh-e Qaf is a legendary mountain in the popular mythology of the Middle East. In Islamic tradition, Mount Qaf is said to be the homeland of the jinn and was made out of shining emerald by God.

Iranian tradition
Historically Iranian power never extended over all of the Northern Caucasus and ancient lore shrouded these high mountains in mystery.
In Iranian tradition this mountain could be any of the following:
 The highest mountain
 The "unknown" mountain referred to as Gapkuh 
 The land of the Daeva (who did not follow Zoroastrianism)
 Saoshyant's battlefield
 Simurgh's nest

The  Peri and Deev kingdoms of Qaf include are Shad-u-kam (Pleasure and Delight), with its magnificent capital Juherabad (Jewel-city), Amberabad (Amber-city), and Ahermanabad (Aherman’s city).

Arabic tradition
Mount Qaf in Arabic tradition is a mysterious mountain renowned as the "farthest point of the earth" owing to its location at the far side of the ocean encircling the earth. Because of its remoteness, the North Pole is sometimes identified with this mountain. According to Hatim Tai’s account, the Qaf Mountains were said
to be composed of green emerald, peridot or chrysolite, whose reflection gave
a greenish tint to the sky. It is regarded as the home of the Jinn race and the place beyond which the unseen divine world begins. In Arabic literature, Qaf was the loftiest of the mountain ranges created by Allah to support the earth and was the parent of all other earthly mountains, to which it was linked by subterranean ranges. The range is separated from the world of men by the oceans that surround the known world. Qaf, as the primeval mountain, came to symbolise the cosmic mountain where the natural and supernatural met and the link between the terrestrial and celestial worlds was established. It is said that the anqa and rukh will come here. The emerald-made cities Jabulqa and Jabulsa, situated in darkness, are said to be contiguous to the mountain Qaf.

Zakariya al-Qazwini published ʿAjā'ib al-makhlūqāt wa gharā'ib al-mawjūdāt ("The Wonders of Creation", literally "Marvels of things created and miraculous aspects of things existing") in the 13th century, a book that was influential in early modern Islamic society. According to Qazwini's cosmology, the sky is held by God so that it does not fall on Earth. The Earth is considered flat (later Islamic scholars believed that it was round) and surrounded by a series of mountains —including Mount Qaf— that hold it in its place like pegs; the Earth is supported by the Kuyuthan that stands on Bahamut, a giant fish ( Bahamūt) dwelling in a cosmic ocean; the ocean is inside a bowl that sits on top of an angel or jinn.

According to certain authors, the Jabal Qaf of Muslim cosmology is a version of Rupes Nigra, a mountain whose ascent —such as Dante's climbing of the Mountain of Purgatory, represents the pilgrim's progress through spiritual states.

Sufi tradition
In some Sufistic oral traditions, as conceived by Abd al-Rahman and Attar, Mount Qaf was considered as a realm of consciousness and the goal of a murid. Hadda Sahib (d. 1903) is said to have visited Mount Qaf in one night and was greeted by the king of peris.

In literature

Mount Qaf (original Turkish title Kafdağı) is also the title of a novel by Turkish author Müge İplikçi.

Mount Qaf is frequently referenced in the 1001 Nights as a home of jinn.

See also
Jabulqa and Jabulsa
The Conference of the Birds (Manṭiq-uṭ-Ṭayr)
Esoteric interpretation of the Quran
Ox (Chinese constellation)
Sutgol, a lake in Turkish mythology
Paristan, Peris Land

Further reading 
 Daniel G. Prior: Travels of Mount Qāf: From Legend to 42° 0' N 79° 51' E. in: Oriente Moderno, Nuova serie, Anno 89, Nr. 2. (Studies on Islamic Legends) 2009, pp. 425–444

Notes

References 

Arabian mythology
Mythological mountains
Jinn-related places
History of the Caucasus
Locations in Persian mythology
North Pole